Diogo Firmino da Silva Fernandes (born 14 November 1996 in Funchal, Madeira), known as Firmino, is a Portuguese footballer who plays for CF Canelas 2010 as a forward.

References

External links

Portuguese League profile 

1996 births
Living people
Sportspeople from Funchal
Portuguese footballers
Madeiran footballers
Association football forwards
Primeira Liga players
Liga Portugal 2 players
Campeonato de Portugal (league) players
C.S. Marítimo players
C.D. Nacional players
C.F. União players
S.C. Praiense players
C.D. Trofense players
Portuguese expatriate footballers
Expatriate footballers in England
Portuguese expatriate sportspeople in England